William Fields (Abt. 1810 - September 9, 1858) was a Texan politician and author from North Carolina.

Life
Fields was born in North Carolina in about 1810. He then moved to Tennessee sometime before 1837. In 1837, he moved to Texas. He moved from Liberty, to Houston, and then back to Liberty before 1842. He married and had 5 children.

Politics
He served in many Texas House districts from 1847 to 1855.

 Liberty District (1847-1849)
 District 24 (1849-1851)
 District 2 (1851-1853)
 District 33 (1853-1855)

References

1810 births
1858 deaths
Members of the Texas House of Representatives
19th-century American politicians